Shota Nakajima is a Japanese-American chef and television personality, best known for competing on the eighteenth season of Top Chef in Portland, Oregon.

Early life and education 
Nakajima was born in Japan, and raised in Seattle, Washington. There, he apprenticed with chef Yasuhiko Sakamoto. He later returned to Seattle and worked for chef Taichi Kitamura at Sushi Kappo Tamura from 2011–2012.

Television appearances 
Nakajima made his TV debut on Food Network's Iron Chef Gauntlet in 2017, where he was the fourth chef eliminated. In 2018, he returned to the Food Network and was featured on Season 16, Episode 4 of Beat Bobby Flay. The two chefs battled each other over Nakajima's signature dish, tempura, and Nakajima was declared the winner. In 2020, Nakajima competed on Top Chef: Portland, where was one of three finalists. He was also voted Fan Favorite of the show.

Chef and restaurateur 
In 2014, Nakajima opened a catering business, Kappo Kitchen and later Naka, a kaiseki restaurant, in June 2015. In February 2017, Naka Kaiseki was transformed as Adana. In March of 2020, Nakajima opened his restaurant Taku, an Osakan kushikatsu concept, in the Capitol Hill neighborhood of Seattle. While he was forced to close Adana and Taku during the COVID-19 pandemic, he reopened Taku in May of 2021 as a karaage restaurant.

In late 2021, Nakajima began bottling his own teriyaki sauce, known as Make Umami, and selling it at Taku, Uwajimaya grocery stores, and on Amazon.

In February 2022, Nakajima announced he was opening a teriyaki restaurant, Banzai Teriyaki, in Cle Elum, Washington. Nakajima later left the project in June 2022.

Awards and accolades 
James Beard Foundation, Semifinalist, Rising Star Chef of the Year (2018)
Eater, Young Guns Winner (2018) 
James Beard Foundation, Semifinalist, Rising Star Chef of the Year (2019) 
James Beard Foundation, Semifinalist, Rising Star Chef of the Year (2020)

References 

Living people
Year of birth missing (living people)
American male chefs
American people of Japanese descent
Asian American chefs
Chefs from Seattle
Iron Chef contestants
Japanese emigrants to the United States
People from Tokyo
Top Chef contestants